Goniastrea is a genus of stony corals in the family Merulinidae. Species belonging to the genus Goniastrea forms massive colonies, usually spherical or elongate, with well developed paliform lobes. Polyps can be seen only at night.

Species 
The following species are currently recognized by the World Register of Marine Species :

 Goniastrea columella Crossland, 1948 
 Goniastrea edwardsi Chevalier, 1971 
 Goniastrea favulus (Dana, 1846)  
 Goniastrea minuta Veron, 2002  
 Goniastrea pectinata (Ehrenberg, 1834) 
 Goniastrea ramosa Veron, 2002 
 Goniastrea retiformis (Lamarck, 1816)
 Goniastrea stelligera (Dana, 1846) 
 Goniastrea thecata Veron, DeVantier & Turak, 2002

References 

Merulinidae
Scleractinia genera